The Wall of Sound (also called the Spector Sound) is a music production formula developed by American record producer Phil Spector at Gold Star Studios, in the 1960s, with assistance from engineer Larry Levine and the conglomerate of session musicians later known as "the Wrecking Crew". The intention was to exploit the possibilities of studio recording to create an unusually dense orchestral aesthetic that came across well through radios and jukeboxes of the era. Spector explained in 1964: "I was looking for a sound, a sound so strong that if the material was not the greatest, the sound would carry the record. It was a case of augmenting, augmenting. It all fit together like a jigsaw."

A popular misconception holds that the Wall of Sound was created simply through a maximum of noise and distortion, but the method was actually more nuanced. To attain the Wall of Sound, Spector's arrangements called for large ensembles (including some instruments not generally used for ensemble playing, such as electric and acoustic guitars), with multiple instruments doubling or tripling many of the parts to create a fuller, richer tone. For example, Spector often duplicated a part played by an acoustic piano with an electric piano and a harpsichord. Mixed well enough, the three instruments would then be indistinguishable to the listener.

Among other features of the sound, Spector incorporated an array of orchestral instruments (strings, woodwind, brass and percussion) not previously associated with youth-oriented pop music. Reverb from an echo chamber was also highlighted for additional texture. He characterized his methods as "a Wagnerian approach to rock & roll: little symphonies for the kids". The combination of large ensembles with reverberation effects also increased the average audio power in a way that resembles compression. By 1979, the use of compression had become common on the radio, marking the trend that led to the loudness war in the 1980s.

The intricacies of the technique were unprecedented in the field of sound production for popular music. According to Beach Boys leader Brian Wilson, who used the formula extensively: "In the '40s and '50s, arrangements were considered 'OK here, listen to that French horn' or 'listen to this string section now.' It was all a definite sound. There weren't combinations of sound and, with the advent of Phil Spector, we find sound combinations, which—scientifically speaking—is a brilliant aspect of sound production."

Origins 

During the late 1950s, Spector worked with Brill Building songwriters Jerry Leiber and Mike Stoller during a period when they sought a fuller sound by the use of excessive instrumentation, using up to five electric guitars and four percussionists. Later this evolved into Spector's Wall of Sound, which Leiber and Stoller considered to be very distinct from what they were doing, stating: "Phil was the first one to use multiple drum kits, three pianos and so on. We went for much more clarity in terms of instrumental colors, and he deliberately blended everything into a kind of mulch. He definitely had a different point of view."

Spector's first production was the self-penned 1958 song "Don't You Worry My Little Pet", performed with his group the Teddy Bears. The recording was achieved by taking a demo tape of the song and playing it back over the studio's speaker system to overdub another performance over it. The end product was a cacophony, with stacked harmony vocals that could not be heard clearly. Spector spent the next several years further developing this unorthodox method of recording.

In the 1960s, Spector usually worked at Gold Star Studios in Los Angeles because of its exceptional echo chambers. He also typically worked with such audio engineers as Larry Levine and the conglomerate of session musicians who later became known as The Wrecking Crew.

Etymology
Andrew Loog Oldham coined the phrase "Phil Spector's Wall of Sound" within advertisements for the Righteous Brothers 1964 single "You've Lost That Lovin' Feelin'". An earlier usage of the phrase "wall of sound" was made in reference to the instrumentation of jazz artist Stan Kenton, who utilized numerous brass instruments to create a vibrating sound that jolted human ears.

Process

Layering

The process was almost the same for most of Spector's recordings, with Spector starting by rehearsing the assembled musicians for several hours before recording. The backing track was performed live and recorded monaurally; a bass drum overdub on "Da Doo Ron Ron" was the exception to the rule.

Songwriter Jeff Barry, who worked extensively with Spector, described the Wall of Sound as "by and large ... a formula arrangement" with "four or five guitars ... two basses in fifths, with the same type of line ... strings ... six or seven horns adding the little punches ... [and] percussion instruments—the little bells, the shakers, the tambourines".

Bob B. Soxx & the Blue Jeans' version of "Zip-A-Dee-Doo-Dah" formed the basis of Spector and Levine's future mixing practices, almost never straying from the formula it established. For the recording of "You've Lost That Lovin' Feelin'", engineer Larry Levine described the process thus: they started by recording four acoustic guitars, playing eight bars over and over again, changing the figure if necessary until Spector thought it ready. They then added the pianos, of which there were three, and if they didn't work together, Spector started again with the guitars. This is followed by three basses, the horns (two trumpets, two trombones, and three saxophones), then finally the drums.  The vocals were then added with Bill Medley and Bobby Hatfield singing into separate microphones and backing vocals supplied by the Blossoms and other singers.

Daniel Lanois recounted a situation during the recording of the track "Goodbye" from Emmylou Harris's Wrecking Ball: "We put a huge amount of compression on the piano and the mandoguitar, and it turned into this fantastic, chimey harmonic instrument. We almost got the old Spector '60s sound, not by layering, but by really compressing what was already there between the melodic events happening between these two instruments." Nonetheless, layering identical instrumental parts remained an integral component of many of Spector's productions, as session musician Barney Kessel recalled:

All early Wall of Sound recordings were made with a three-track Ampex 350 tape recorder. Levine explained that during mixing, "I [would] record the same thing on two of the [Ampex machine's] three tracks just to reinforce the sound, and then I would erase one of those and replace it with the voice. The console had a very limited equalizer for each input ... That was basically it in terms of effects, aside from the two echo chambers that were also there, of course, directly behind the control room."

Echo 
Microphones in the recording studio captured the musicians' performance, which was then transmitted to an echo chamber—a basement room fitted with speakers and microphones. The signal from the studio was played through the speakers and reverberated throughout the room before being picked up by the microphones. The echo-laden sound was then channeled back to the control room, where it was recorded on tape. The natural reverberation and echo from the hard walls of the echo chamber gave Spector's productions their distinctive quality and resulted in a rich, complex sound that, when played on AM radio, had a texture rarely heard in musical recordings. Jeff Barry said: "Phil used his own formula for echo, and some overtone arrangements with the strings."

Spill 

During the mixing for "Zip-A-Dee-Doo-Dah", Spector turned off the track designated for electric guitar (played on this occasion by Billy Strange). However, the sound of the guitar could still be heard spilling onto other microphones in the room, creating a ghostly ambiance that obscured the instrument. In reference to this nuance of the song's recording, music professor Albin Zak has written:

Levine disliked Spector's penchant for mic bleeding, accordingly: "I never wanted all the bleed between instruments – I had it, but I never wanted it – and since I had to live with it, that meant manipulating other things to lessen the effect; bringing the guitars up just a hair and the drums down just a hair so that it didn't sound like it was bleeding." In order to offset the mixing problems percussion leakage caused, he applied a minimal number of microphones to the drum kits, using Neumann U67s overhead and RCA 77s on the kick to establish a feeling of presence.

Mono 

According to Zak: "Aside from the issues of retail and radio exposure, mono recordings represented an aesthetic frame for musicians and producers, who had grown up with them." Despite the trend toward multi-channel recording, Spector was vehemently opposed to stereo releases, claiming that it took control of the record's sound away from the producer in favor of the listener, resulting in an infringement of the Wall of Sound's carefully balanced combination of sonic textures as they were meant to be heard. Brian Wilson agreed, stating: "I look at sound like a painting, you have a balance and the balance is conceived in your mind. You finish the sound, dub it down, and you’ve stamped out a picture of your balance with the mono dubdown. But in stereo, you leave that dubdown to the listener—to his speaker placement and speaker balance. It just doesn't seem complete to me."

Misconceptions

As a maximum of noise

It has been inaccurately suggested in critical shorthand that Spector's "wall of sound" filled every second with a maximum of noise.  Levine recalled how "other engineers" mistakenly thought that the process was "turning up all the faders to get full saturation, but all that achieved was distortion." Biographer David Hinckley wrote that the Wall of Sound was flexible, more complex, and more subtle, elaborating:

The Wall of Sound has been contrasted with "the standard pop mix of foregrounded solo vocal and balanced, blended backing" as well as the airy mixes typical of reggae and funk. Musicologist Richard Middleton wrote: "This can be contrasted with the open spaces and more equal lines of typical funk and reggae textures [for example], which seem to invite [listeners] to insert [themselves] in those spaces and actively participate." Supporting this, Jeff Barry said, "[Spector] buried the lead and he cannot stop himself from doing that ... if you listen to his records in sequence, the lead goes further and further in and to me what he is saying is, 'It is not the song... just listen to those strings. I want more musicians, it's me.

Closer reflection reveals that the Wall of Sound was compatible with, even supportive of, vocal protagonism. Such virtuosity was ultimately serving of Spector's own agenda—The Righteous Brothers' vocal prowess provided him a "secure and prosperous headrest", such as in Bobby Hatfield's rendering of "Unchained Melody".

As a generic term
According to author Matthew Bannister, Spector's Wall of Sound is distinct from what's typically characterized as a "wall of sound" in rock music. Bannister writes that, during the 1980s, "Jangle and drone plus reverberation create[d] a contemporary equivalent of Spector's 'Wall of Sound' – a massive, ringing, cavernous noise and a device used by many indie groups: Flying Nun, from Sneaky Feelings' Send You to Straitjacket Fits and the JPS Experience". He cites 1960s psychedelic and garage rock such as the Byrds' "Eight Miles High" (1966) as a primary musical influence on the movement.

Legacy and popularity

Phil Spector 

The Wall of Sound forms the foundation of Phil Spector's recordings. Certain records are considered to have epitomized its use. Spector himself is quoted as believing his production of Ike and Tina Turner's "River Deep, Mountain High" to be the summit of his Wall of Sound productions, and this sentiment has been echoed by George Harrison, who called it "a perfect record from start to finish".

Brian Wilson 

Outside of Spector's own songs, the most recognizable example of the "Wall of Sound" is heard on many classic hits recorded by The Beach Boys (e.g., "God Only Knows", "Wouldn't It Be Nice"—and especially, the psychedelic "pocket symphony" of "Good Vibrations"), for which Brian Wilson used a similar recording technique, especially during the Pet Sounds and Smile eras of the band. Wilson considers Pet Sounds to be a concept album centered around interpretations of Phil Spector's recording methods. Author Domenic Priore observed, "The Ronettes had sung a dynamic version of The Students' 1961 hit 'I'm So Young', and Wilson went right for it, but took the Wall of Sound in a different direction. Where Phil would go for total effect by bringing the music to the edge of cacophony – and therefore rocking to the tenth power – Brian seemed to prefer audio clarity. His production method was to spread out the sound and arrangement, giving the music a more lush, comfortable feel."

According to Larry Levine, "Brian was one of the few people in the music business Phil respected. There was a mutual respect. Brian might say that he learned how to produce from watching Phil, but the truth is, he was already producing records before he observed Phil. He just wasn't getting credit for it, something that in the early days, I remember really used to make Phil angry. Phil would tell anybody who listened that Brian was one of the great producers."

Others 

After Sonny Bono was fired from Philles Records, he signed up with Atlantic Records and recruited some of Spector's colleagues to create "I Got You Babe" (which went to No. 1 on Billboard Hot 100) and "Baby Don't Go" (No. 8), both of which featured elements of the Wall of Sound, among other songs. Similarly, when the Righteous Brothers ended their relationship with Spector and signed with Verve/MGM Records in 1966, they released "(You're My) Soul and Inspiration", which Medley produced using this approach and also reached No. 1 on the Billboard Hot 100, and stayed at the top for three weeks.

One of the earliest persons outside of Spector's talent pool to adopt the Wall of Sound approach was British producer Johnny Franz, specifically his work with Dusty Springfield and the Walker Brothers, with songs such as "I Only Want to Be with You" and "You Don't Have to Say You Love Me" for the former and "Make It Easy On Yourself" and "The Sun Ain't Gonna Shine (Anymore)" for the latter (both of which were No. 1 hits in the United Kingdom). 

Another was the productions of Shadow Morton, such as his work with the Shangri-Las, one of which, "Leader of the Pack", went to No. 1 in the United States. According to Billy Joel (who played piano in another Shangri-Las song, "Remember (Walking in the Sand)"), Morton aspired to become the Phil Spector of the East Coast.

Another prominent example that reached the top of the Billboard Hot 100 was Simon and Garfunkel's "Bridge over Troubled Water", which utilized the Wall of Sound with great effect towards the end, with the help of the Wrecking Crew. The production was modeled on the Righteous Brothers' version of "Old Man River", and Art Garfunkel has explicitly compared it to the Spector-produced "Let It Be". Spector's work with the Righteous Brothers also influenced the R&B band Checkmates, Ltd., with songs such as "I Can Hear the Rain", "Please Don't Take My World Away", and "Walk in the Sunlight". It was because of such experiments that their manager sought to secure Spector's involvement for their second album, Love Is All We Have to Give.

In 1973, British band Wizzard revived the Wall of Sound in three of their hits "See My Baby Jive", "Angel Fingers" and "I Wish It Could Be Christmas Everyday". "See My Baby Jive" later influenced ABBA's song "Waterloo".

ABBA also utilized the technique for songs starting with "People Need Love" and fully realized with songs such as "Ring Ring", "Waterloo", and "Dancing Queen"; prior to recording "Ring Ring", engineer Michael B. Tretow had read Richard Williams' book Out of His Head: The Sound of Phil Spector, which inspired him to layer multiple instrumental overdubs on the band's recordings to simulate an orchestra, becoming an integral part of ABBA's sound. Bruce Springsteen also emulated the Wall of Sound in his album Born to Run, starting with the titular song, backed by the E Street Band. The E Street Band would become famous practitioners of this method, with songs such as Ronnie Spector's cover of Billy Joel's "Say Goodbye to Hollywood" (itself conceived as a tribute to the Ronettes).

Jim Steinman and Todd Rundgren, composer and producer of Meat Loaf's Bat Out of Hell, respectively, utilized the Wall of Sound for the album. Steinman composed the songs based on Spector's productions as well as Wagner and Springsteen (also including the E Street Band's Roy Bittan and Max Weinberg on piano and drums, respectively), with the title track also being influenced by songs such as "Leader of the Pack". As with Brian Wilson, Steinman had aimed to create "anthems to the kind of feeling you get listening to 'Be My Baby for the album. Steinman would later similarly utilize such instrumentation in his own productions for other songs, such as Bonnie Tyler's "Total Eclipse of the Heart" (produced specifically in Spector's model), to the point that his discography ranging from Air Supply ("Making Love Out of Nothing at All") to Celine Dion ("It's All Coming Back to Me Now") has been described as an "alternate-universe Wall of Sound". When asked about his involvement with Dion for songs such as "River Deep – Mountain High" in the album Falling Into You, Spector denounced Steinman and other producers as "amateurs, students, and bad clones of yours truly", to which Steinman responded, "I’m thrilled to be insulted by Phil Spector. He’s my God, my idol. To be insulted by Phil Spector is a big honor. If he spits on me I consider myself purified."

The Wall of Sound was also utilized by The Jesus and Mary Chain ("Just Like Honey"), Mark Wirtz ("Excerpt from A Teenage Opera"), The Kursaal Flyers ("Little Does She Know"), The Alan Parsons Project ("Don't Answer Me"), Spiritualized (Ladies and Gentlemen We Are Floating in Space, Let It Come Down) and Eiichi Ohtaki (Niagara Calendar).

Wagnerian rock derives its characterization from a merge between Spector's Wall of Sound and the operas of Richard Wagner.

Citations

General bibliography 

 
 
 
 
 
 
 
 
 
 

Music production
Musical techniques
Musical terminology
Phil Spector
Recording
Sound production